Amrahlu (also Romanized as Amrāhlū; also known as Kakīl) is a village in Ojarud-e Markazi Rural District, in the Central District of Germi County, Ardabil Province, Iran. At the 2006 census, its population was 242, in 53 families.

References 

Towns and villages in Germi County